Tyler Scott Everet (born November 4, 1983) is a former American football safety in the National Football League for the Chicago Bears and Minnesota Vikings. He was signed by the Denver Broncos as an undrafted free agent in 2006. He played college football at Ohio State University.

Early years
Everett attended Canton McKinley High School, where he played as a running back and defensive back. As a junior, he rushed for over 1,300 yards. As a senior, he received All-Ohio honors as a defensive back.

He accepted a football scholarship from Ohio State University. As a freshman, he was a backup and was part of the 2002 National Championship team. As a senior, he appeared in 10 games with 9 starts, collecting 33 tackles, one sack, one interception and 2 passes defensed.

He finished his college career with 48 games (16 starts), 102 tackles, 4 interceptions, 13 passes defensed, one forced fumble and one fumble recovery.

Professional career

Denver Broncos
Everett was signed as an undrafted free agent by the Denver Broncos after the 2006 NFL Draft on May 3.  He was waived before the start of the season.

Chicago Bears
In 2006, he was signed to the Chicago Bears' practice squad where he spent the first 13 weeks of the season. On December 12, he was promoted to the active roster in order to bolster the safety position following injuries to Mike Brown and Todd Johnson. He was active in 3 games, but did not record any stats. The team would go on to play in Super Bowl XLI. He was released on September 1, 2007.

Minnesota Vikings
On September 3, 2007, he was signed to the practice squad of the Minnesota Vikings, where he spent the rest of the season.

Dallas Cowboys
On January 15, 2008, he was signed as a free agent by the Dallas Cowboys. He was released on August 28.

Edmonton Eskimos (CFL)
On May 26, 2009, he signed with the Edmonton Eskimos of the Canadian Football League. He was released on June 6.

Personal life
If the Chicago Bears had won Super Bowl XLI, Everett would have won a championship at the high school, college and professional levels. As they lost, this honor went to fellow Canton McKinley High School and Ohio State graduate, Colt safety Mike Doss.

References

1983 births
Living people
American football safeties
Chicago Bears players
Minnesota Vikings players
Ohio State Buckeyes football players
Players of American football from Canton, Ohio